The 1913 Mississippi College Collegians football team represented Mississippi College in the 1913 Southern Intercollegiate Athletic Association football season.

Schedule

References

Mississippi College
Mississippi College Choctaws football seasons
Mississippi College Collegians football